.tm is the Internet country code top-level domain (ccTLD) for Turkmenistan. It is operated by Internet Computer Bureau.

Nic.tm offers domain name purchase, registration, management and renewal as well as Internationalized Domain Name registration for entities who wish to register their domain names using local Turkmen language characters.

It has been marketed as a domain for businesses with trademarks, due to the common use of "TM" in this context.

Registrars 
Domains can be bought directly from the registry or from accredited registrars. The registry currently has registrars from 25 different countries.

Domains can be transferred between accredited registrars via an Auth-Code.

References

External links
 IANA .tm whois information
 List of officially accredited registrars

Tm
Communications in Turkmenistan
Computer-related introductions in 1997

sv:Toppdomän#T